A taḥmīlah is a type of instrumental piece in Arabic music. Often played by a takht ensemble, the tahmilah features the alternation between solo instruments and the full ensemble.

See also
Concerto grosso

Arabic music
Musical forms